AllBright Law Offices is a Shanghai-based Chinese law firm ranked the seventh largest in the country and eighth largest in Asia by number of lawyers. Among national corporate law firms, AllBright is the only one headquartered in Shanghai.

AllBright was founded on January 1, 1999 from the merger of three Shanghai-based law firms, Jin Lian, Tianhe, and Great Wall.

Practice areas
AllBright's main practice areas include:
 Corporate and commercial (including mergers and acquisitions)
 Securities and capital markets 
 Banking and finance 
 Real estate and infrastructure
 Intellectual property
 International trade (including WTO disputes)
 Dispute resolution (arbitration and litigation)

Offices

AllBright presently has offices located in 12 cities in mainland China and Hong Kong SAR:

 Shanghai, Beijing, Chengdu, Chongqing, Hangzhou, Nanjing, Qingdao, Shenzhen, Suzhou, Taiyuan, Xiamen
 Hong Kong

AllBright marked the opening of its first office outside of mainland China on November 15, 2013 through an association and eventual merger with the Hong Kong-based law firm of Stevenson, Wong & Co.

Global alliances

AllBright has a long-standing strategic alliance with NCTM Law Firm of Italy.

AllBright is one of the original member firms of the Sino-Global Legal Alliance, which was formed with Lovells in 2007. The SGLA is a non-exclusive referral network which provides clients with legal services in mainland China and abroad.

AllBright signed a formal (non-exclusive) cooperation agreement in 2012 with De Pardieu law firm of France, cementing already existing working relationships on cross-border transactions.

References 

Asia's Top 50 Largest Law Firms (Asian Legal Business)

External links
 Official website
 
 Stevenson, Wong & Co. (associated firm)

Law firms of China